Uolevi Kahelin (born 17 June 1950) is a Finnish weightlifter. He competed in the men's featherweight event at the 1984 Summer Olympics.

References

External links
 

1950 births
Living people
Finnish male weightlifters
Olympic weightlifters of Finland
Weightlifters at the 1984 Summer Olympics
People from Kokkola
Sportspeople from Central Ostrobothnia
20th-century Finnish people